The African Journal of Infectious Diseases covers research on the pathogenesis, diagnosis, epidemiology, and treatment of infectious diseases, the impact of infectious agents on the environment, and related disciplines. It is published by the African Ethnomedicines Network.


Abstracting and indexing
The journal is abstracted and indexed in:
 CAB Direct database
 Embase
 Scopus
 Veterinary Science Database

References

External links 
 

Publications established in 2007
Health in Africa
Microbiology journals
Open access journals
English-language journals